Africa's Young Entrepreneurs (A.Y.E.) is a non-profit organisation based in Johannesburg, South Africa. It facilitates intra-trade among African entrepreneurs in 19 countries. It is the largest Economic group in Africa with more than 12 million pan African members.

A.Y.E is also the largest Entrepreneurship organization in the world.

History 
A.Y.E was founded by Summy Smart Francis, a Nigerian entrepreneur, in 2010. After spending two years on researching and studying the African economy, the group started operations in 2012.

Work 
The organisation holds conferences and funds startups through various competitions. It also works for researching and suggest ways to improve Africa's economy. The organisation also produces the world's largest entrepreneurship reality TV show. (Africa's Young Entrepreneurs Reality TV Show) where thousands of African entrepreneurs are showcased and empowered.

AYEEP 
In 2014, the organisation launched its Africa's Young Entrepreneurs Empowerment Program (AYEEP). AYEEP is a 3-day conference. As part of the program, several entrepreneurs present their business ideas after which some of the businesses are selected and funded by the organisation. In 2014, the organisation funded businesses with 50 million Nairas and in 2015 with 150 million Nairas. In 2016,500 entrepreneurs were empowered through the AYEEN program.

AYESA 
A.Y.E launched Africa's Young Entrepreneurs Student's Association (AYESA) in 2015. The organisation spent over $100,000 from internally generated revenue to research and launch AYESA. The inaugural conference of AYESA was held at the University of Lagos in  December 2015. It presents young student entrepreneurs in need of experience, knowledge, mentorship and industry business skills with choice mentors from diverse business sectors in Africa.

Economic Development Team 
In 2015, A.Y.E launched an Economic Development Team as part of the effort to improve the economy of African countries. The team works with federal as well as state governments in Africa to improve the growth of the continent. The group also works to facilitate investment opportunity for global entrepreneurs and investors.

Africa's Young Entrepreneurs is the largest network of entrepreneurs in the world.

References

External links 
Official website

2010 establishments in South Africa
Non-profit organisations based in South Africa
Organisations based in Johannesburg
Organizations established in 2010
Entrepreneurship organizations